Garden is a surname. Notable people with the surname include:

 Alexander Garden (naturalist) (1730–1791), known by the botanical author abbreviation "Garden"
 Alexander Garden (poet), Scottish poet from Aberdeenshire
 Francis Garden (disambiguation):
 Francis Garden, Lord Gardenstone (1721–1793), Scottish judge, joint Solicitor General for Scotland 1760–64, Lord of Session 1764–93
 Francis Garden (theologian) (1810–1884), English theologian
 George Garden (politician) (c. 1772–1828), Scottish-born businessman and politician in Lower Canada
 George Garden (minister) (1649–1733), Scottish church minister
 Graeme Garden (born 1943), British comedy writer and performer
 Henry Garden (1868–1949), Irish footballer
 James Garden (1847–1914), engineer and Mayor of Vancouver
 James R. Garden (1942-2006), artist, gentleman farmer and councilman of Beekmantown, NY 1980-2006
Jennifer Garden, British chemist
 Jock Garden (1882–1968), founder of Australia's communist party
 Mary Garden (1874–1967), Scottish-American operatic soprano
 Nancy Garden (1938–2014), American author of children's and young adult literature
 Stuart Garden (born 1972), Scottish football player and manager
 Timothy Garden, Baron Garden (1944–2007), formerly a senior Royal Air Force commander, now a politician
 William Brownie Garden, inventor